Li Jia may refer to:

Li Jia (born 1961), male Chinese politician, Deputy Communist Party Secretary of Inner Mongolia
Li Jia (born 1964), male Chinese politician, former Communist Party Secretary of Zhuhai
Li Jia (born 1966), female Chinese politician, former Party Secretary of Ziyang, Sichuan
Li Jia (table tennis), (born 1981) female table tennis player, peak of career from 2000 to 2003
Li Kezhu (李柯竺), born Li Jia, Chinese actress who appeared in The Park (2007 film)